FM104 is an independent local radio station broadcast across Dublin, Ireland, on the frequency 104.4 MHz. It is operated by Capital Radio Productions Limited (unconnected with, and not to be confused with, Capital Radio plc), and is a subsidiary of the Wireless Group, which itself is a subsidiary of News UK. The station broadcasts under a contract from the Broadcasting Authority of Ireland.  FM104 broadcasts from Macken House in Dublin's Docklands.

History
Capital Radio, as the station was originally called, was the first Independent Local Radio contractor to take to the air on 20 July 1989. The station was owned by a consortium of Irish media and entertainment figures and managed by Mike Hogan. Although initially moderately successful, following the launch of rival 98FM, the station consistently trailed in the ratings. In May 1991, the station relaunched as Rock 104; however, this was unsuccessful and in late 1991 it underwent a restructuring under new CEO Dermot Hanrahan, who relaunched the station in April 1992 as Dublin's FM104, using the tag-line "Superstars of the 80s and 90s". This format was moderately successful allowing the station to reach financial stability. However, the station still lagged behind its competitor 98FM. A change in programming direction in 1995, together with the introduction of the highly successful Strawberry Alarm Clock, saw it finally overtake 98FM, though 98FM would itself undergo a (less radical) relaunch, dropping the "Classic Hits" moniker, and poaching Chris Barry for a time. In April 1996 FM104 moved into the Number 1 slot in the Dublin market for the first time. Since then, FM104 and 98FM have been keen rivals.

In 2004 the original shareholders sold the station to Scottish Radio Holdings for €30 million, in the first of a sequence of ownership changes. SRH were subsequently sold to EMAP, who in turn sold the station in 2007.

Denis O'Brien's Communicorp was the highest bidder for Emap's Irish operations when that company decided to sell its radio stations, buying FM104, Highland Radio and Today FM on 14 July 2007. In October 2007, the Broadcasting Commission of Ireland (BCI) approved Communicorp's proposed takeover of Today FM and Highland Radio, but not FM104. The deal was completed by January 2008. Due to a Competition Authority decision, Communicorp was required to sell-on FM104, which it did (to UTV Media) immediately upon its acquisition. O'Brien offloaded Highland Radio in mid-2008.

On 8 October 2007, it was announced by the Broadcasting Commission of Ireland that it would not agree to the sale of FM104 to Communicorp, although it granted approval for the acquisition of Today FM and Highland Radio. On 19 December 2007 it was announced that UTV Media had agreed to purchase FM104, subject to approval from the BCI and the Competition Authority. Under the structure of the agreement, Communicorp acquired FM104 but sold it immediately to UTV Media, thus keeping to the spirit of the earlier BCI ruling and allowing it to acquire the other EMAP stations. The sale of FM104 to UTV Media was completed on 10 April 2008.

List of current FM104 presenters
 Jim Nugent (FM104's Strawberry Alarm Clock)
 Tara Murray (FM104's 10-3 Show)
 Graham O’Toole (104Drive with Graham & Nathan)
 Nathan O’Reilly (104Drive with Graham & Nathan)
 Mikey O’Reilly (FM104's Hit Mix Sunday to Thursday)
 Louise Tighe (FM104's Switched On / FM104's Select Irish)
 Al Gibbs (FM104's Freaks on Friday)
 Thomas Crosse (FM104's Gerrup Outta Dat with Crossy & Enya)
 Enya Martin (FM104's Gerrup Outta Dat with Crossy & Enya)
 Ciaran Halpin (FM104's Saturday & Sunday on 104)
 Frank Jez (FM104's Block Party Mix / FM104's Big Urban Mix)
 Seán Munsanje (FM104's The Juice)
 Eamon Duffy (FM104's 90s and 00s)

FM104 News
FM104's News output, is branded on air as FM104 Live. Intro of the updates reference the various ways of accessing FM104 (FM, Online, Mobile). The news focus is local to Dublin, with coverage of national public interest stories, and major international events. Main news bulletins are simulcast on sister station, Dublin's Q102

FM104 News Team
 Kevin O’Mahony (Head of News)
 Hazel Nolan
 Louise Phelan D'Cruz
 Alison O’Reilly

FM104 sports reporters
 Peter Branigan
 Declan Drake

FM104 podcasts
Podcasts are available on the FM104 website, and all major podcasting platforms of FM104's Strawberry Alarm Clock.

References

External links
 

Contemporary hit radio stations in Ireland
Mass media companies of Ireland
Mass media in Dublin (city)
Radio stations in the Republic of Ireland
Adult contemporary radio stations in Ireland
Radio stations established in 1989
Wireless Group
1989 establishments in Ireland